Daniele Gilardoni (born 1 April 1976) is an Italian lightweight rower.
He is rated among the Top 10 male rowers active in 2008 and is an eleven-time gold medalist at the World Rowing Championships.

Biography
After his sports career he became the manager of Italians Rowing Colleges ("College Remiero Pavia" and "College Remiero Ferrara") and a Vice President of the Associazione Nazionale Atleti Canottaggio (National Association of Rowers).

See also
Most successful athlete in each sport at the World Championships

References

External links
 

1976 births
Living people
Italian male rowers
World Rowing Championships medalists for Italy